"Let Me Hold You" is a song by American rapper Bow Wow. It was the first single off his fourth album, Wanted (2005). Released on March 11, 2005, the song features American R&B singer Omarion (the first collaboration they did together). It was co-written and co-produced by frequent producer Jermaine Dupri and No I.D. and uses a sample of Luther Vandross' 1985 version of Brenda Russell's "If Only for One Night".

The song received positive reviews from critics. "Let Me Hold You" peaked at number four on the Billboard Hot 100, making this the first top 10 hit for both Bow Wow and for Omarion as a solo artist. It also became a number-one hit for both artists on the Hot Rap Songs chart and stayed there for seven weeks. The song also peaked at numbers 2 and 10 on both the Hot R&B/Hip-Hop Songs and Mainstream Top 40 charts respectively, and reached the top 40 in countries like Australia, New Zealand, Ireland and the UK. The song was certified Platinum by the Recording Industry Association of America (RIAA) for selling over 1,000,000 copies. A music video, directed by Bryan Barber, was made to promote the single and featured Bow Wow and Omarion hanging out at a house party.

Background

Bow Wow had publicly announced his interpretation of the song's meaning as he stated in an interview with MTV: "Basically the song is me talking to a girl and telling her, 'These are the things I can do for you. Let me hold you down. This is what I want to do for you as a man. These are the things I'm capable of doing for you if you get with me. Just hear me out.' I'm just really talking to the ladies. The song is really special to me, and I love that song." The collaboration began when Bow Wow was talking with producer Jermaine Dupri about the song and how he suggested on getting Omarion to appear on the track.

In a 2011 retrospective of his previous hits with Complex, producer No I.D. said that this was the first time he worked with Dupri and was asked by him to bring over his samples to pick one that would be used for a single to finish off the album. He played him the Luther Vandross sample and was hesitant about his initial reaction at first before thinking it over and seeing its potential as a smash hit.

Composition
"Let Me Hold You" was co-written and co-produced by Jermaine Dupri and No ID. It features a sample of Luther Vandross' version of "If Only for One Night", written and originally performed by Brenda Russell. The song is in 4/4 time and in the key of E♭ minor.

Critical reception
The song received positive reviews from music critics. AllMusic's David Jeffries put it alongside "Like You" as the album's highlights that work "on a more adult level." Steve 'Flash' Juon of RapReviews praised the production by Dupri and No ID for their clever take on the sample, Bow Wow's lyrics and Omarion's guest vocal performance. Angie Romero of Vibe praised the sing-song hook for making the track "undeniably catchy."

Commercial performance

"Let Me Hold You" debuted at number 93 on the Billboard Hot 100 for the week of May 21, 2005. Three weeks later, it moved twenty-two spots from number 73 to 51 for the week of June 11, 2005. It moved eleven spots from number 28 to 17 for the week of July 2, 2005. It moved four spots from number 15 to 11 for the week of July 16, 2005. It reached the top ten for the week of July 23, 2005, at number eight. It reached its peak at number four and spent a total of 24 weeks on the chart. With the release of "Let Me Hold You", Bow Wow achieved his first top ten hit on the Billboard Hot 100, surpassing his 2003 hit "Let's Get Down" which peaked at number 14. The song was also Omarion's first top-10 hit as a solo artist, although he previously had a number-one hit with "Bump, Bump, Bump" as a member of B2K.

"Let Me Hold You" was Bow Wow and Omarion's first entry on the Pop 100, where it peaked at number 14. On the Hot R&B/Hip-Hop Songs chart, the single peaked at number two. The song also became a number-one hit for both artists on the Hot Rap Songs chart for seven weeks and the Rhythmic Top 40 chart for five weeks. On May 14, 2006, "Let Me Hold You" was certified Platinum by the Recording Industry Association of America (RIAA) for selling over 1,000,000 copies in the United States.

Music video
The song's music video, directed by Bryan Barber, features Bow Wow attempting to woo a girl with mixed results. After surprising her at her house, the two attend a house party, but problems arise as she is less social than Bow Wow, who begins talking to other girls. After a brief reconciliation, the two argue again over the music at the party. Once again, the two are able to reconcile, but things remain awkward, and they do not communicate on their return home. The video appears to be an unresolved cliffhanger, but a "to be continued" title is shown as the video ends. (The video's story is continued in Bow Wow's next video, "Like You".) The video features a cameo from the song's co-producer, Jermaine Dupri.

Live performances
"Let Me Hold You" was a staple at concerts for Bow Wow's 2005 summer tour Scream Tour IV. It was performed at the 2005 American Music Awards on November 22, 2005, as part of a medley with Bow Wow's "Like You" and Omarion's "O".

Awards and nominations

Track listings
US 12-inch vinyl
 "Let Me Hold You" (radio version)
 "Let Me Hold You" (instrumental)
 "Let Me Hold You" (album version)
 "Let Me Hold You" (instrumental with background vocals)

UK CD single
 "Let Me Hold You" (radio version)
 "My Baby" (album version without intro)

Australian CD single
 "Let Me Hold You" (radio version) – 4:08
 "Let Me Hold You" (album version) – 4:08
 "Mo Money" – 4:06
 "Let Me Hold You" (instrumental) – 4:08
 "Let Me Hold You" (video)

Credits and personnel
Credits are adapted from the liner notes of Wanted.

Recording
 Recorded at Southside Studios, Atlanta, GA, Battery Studios, NY and The Record Plant, Hollywood
 Mixed at Southside Studios, Atlanta, GA

Personnel
 Jermaine Dupri – producer, mixer
 No ID – co-producer
 John Horesco IV – recording, assistant engineer
 Tadd Mingo – assistant engineer
 Brian McCarthy – assistant engineer
 Gelli – assistant engineer
 Phil Tan – mixer

Charts

Weekly charts

Year-end charts

Certifications

Release history

See also
 List of Billboard number-one rap singles of the 2000s
 List of Billboard Rhythmic number-one songs of the 2000s

References

2004 songs
2005 singles
Bow Wow (rapper) songs
Omarion songs
Columbia Records singles
Contemporary R&B ballads
Music videos directed by Bryan Barber
Song recordings produced by Jermaine Dupri
Song recordings produced by No I.D.
Songs written by Jermaine Dupri
Songs written by No I.D.
Songs written by Brenda Russell